Joaquinzão, also known as Estádio Joaquim de Morais Filho,  is a multi-use stadium located in Taubaté, Brazil. It is used mostly for football matches and hosts the home matches of Esporte Clube Taubaté. The stadium has a maximum capacity of 9,600 people and was built in 1968.

References

External links
Templos do Futebol

Football venues in São Paulo (state)
Sports venues in São Paulo (state)